The 2006 Eneco Tour road cycling race took place from 16 to 23 August, two weeks later in the season than the year before. The second edition of the Eneco Tour covered parts of the Netherlands, Belgium and Germany. As in 2005, 23 teams took part in the race. Next to the 20 UCI ProTour teams,  and  received wild card entries. 

The race itself was very close, as both the prologue (6 km) and timetrial (16 km) were quite short which led to small time differences. A dramatic conclusion on the last day rendered Stefan Schumacher the victory over George Hincapie, with just one second of advantage. Other riders who stood out during this race were the Belgians Tom Boonen and Philippe Gilbert, who both won in their home region. Other wins came from Manuel Quinziato and David Kopp.

Schedule

Stages

16-08-2006: Den Helder, 6.1 km. (ITT)

17-08-2006: Wieringerwerf-Hoogeveen, 176.9 km.

18-08-2006: 's-Hertogenbosch-Sittard Geleen, 194.6 km.

19-08-2006: Beek-Westmalle, 185 km.

20-08-2006: Landgraaf, 16.1 km. (ITT)

21-08-2006: Hasselt-Balen, 183.1 km.

22-08-2006: Bornem-Sint Truiden, 213.9 km.

23-08-2006: Ans-Ans, 201.2 km. 

In the last final meters, Stefan Schumacher got hit by an arm from a supporter and as a result made an awkward move away from the supporters to the middle of the road, which resulted in George Hincapie falling down. Before the move it looked like Schumacher was going to become second and Hincapie third, which would make Hincapie the winner with an advantage of 1 second. Since Hincapie crashed he did not take any bonus seconds for ending in the top three and because Schumacher managed to restart his sprint and end third he took 4 bonus seconds and so won by 1 second. The jury took about twenty minutes deciding if Schumacher should be removed to the back of the peloton but in the end they concluded that Schumacher did not make the move on purpose and thus Schumacher won the Eneco Tour 2006. Some reactions:
 Dirk Demol, sports director of Discovery Channel Pro Cycling Team: "If you look at the replay, you can clearly see that George Hincapie was surely going to end in second or third place. Even if he was going to be beaten by Schumacher in the sprint and end third, he would still be first in the overall standings. Surely we will issue a complaint."
 Stefan Schumacher: "I'm not happy right now, it's a shame it has to end this way. For my career it's a big step, because it's my biggest win so far, but still I'm not happy right now.
 Croatian jury president Bruno Valcic: "It was a tough decision for us, but Schumacher clearly got hit by a supporter and surely did not bring George Hincapie down on purpose."

General classification
The leader of the general classification (ENECO Energie leiderstrui) wears a red jersey.

KOM Classification
There was no King Of the Mountains jersey this year. Instead, during some of the climbs bonus seconds were handed out in stages 6 and 7.

Points Classification
The leader of the points classification (Lotto Puntenklassement) wears a white jersey.

Best Young Rider
The leader of the Best Young Rider Classification (Topsport Vlaanderen jongerenklassement) wears a yellow jersey.

Best Team

Jersey progress

UCI ProTour Points
The Eneco Tour 2006 is part of the UCI ProTour and so the riders can earn UCI ProTour Points. Below is states which riders won points and where. Because the Eneco Tour 2006 is a smaller stage race the points given are 3, 2 and 1 for the first three in each stage result. At the end of the tour, the top 10 in the standings receive points accorded as follows: 50, 40, 35, 30, 25, 20, 15, 10, 5 and 2.

External links
Race website
Eneco Tour 2006 on cyclingnews.com

2006 UCI ProTour
2006
Eneco
2006 in Dutch sport
2006 Eneco Tour
2006 Eneco Tour